Onga/Waffa Rural LLG is a local-level government (LLG) of Morobe Province, Papua New Guinea.

Wards
01. Tapakainantu
02. Imane
03. Kusing
04. Siaga
05. Tumbuna
06. Ngarowain
07. Guruf
08. Itsingants
09. Antir
10. Intoap
11. Wampul/Miril/Umisuan
12. Singas / Awan Singas
13. Onga

References

Local-level governments of Morobe Province